Bhil or Bheel  is an ethnic group in western India. They speak the Bhil languages, a subgroup of the Western Zone of the Indo-Aryan languages.

Bhils are listed as tribal people of the states of Gujarat, Madhya Pradesh, Chhattisgarh, Maharashtra and Rajasthan—all in the western Deccan regions and central India—as well as in Tripura in far-eastern India, on the border with Bangladesh. Bhils are divided into a number of endogamous territorial divisions, which in turn have a number of clans and lineages. Many Bhils now speak the dominant later language of the region they reside in, such as Marathi, Gujarati or a Bhili language dialect.

Etymology
Some scholars suggest that the term Bhil is derived from the word billa or billu which means bow in the Dravidian lexis. The term Bhil is used to refer to "various ethnic communities" living in the forests and hills of Rajasthan's southern parts and surrounding regions of western India, highlighting the "popularity of the bow and arrow as a weapon among these groups". It is also used as a blanket term to refer to the autochthonous peoples of these areas.

History 
Before the Independence of India, in Baria State, the Bhil women were Concubines for the Koli landlords.

Some of the Bhil chief's of early medieval Ahmedabad claim the status of Kolis in the medieval period. The Kolis of Gujarat being a part of the agricultural population, the Kolis might have included some other social groups claiming agriculturist status. The Kolis were not good cultivators in the medieval period and are not described as an economically homogeneous caste at the end of the nineteenth century. The character of the Kolis, as agriculturists, varies much in different parts of the Gujarat. Crimes of violence are occasionally committed among Kolis they were known as outlaw. but, as a warrior caste, they have settled down in the position of peaceful husbandmen marked contrast to their lawless practices fifty years ago. The Kolis of medieval Gujarat too figure in medieval source more as lawless elements than as peaceful producers. Raja Vikramajit, Shahjahan's governor of Gujarat, had to conduct an expedition in 1622 against Jagirdar Kolis in north of Ahmedabad who had been for generations a terror to travellers. Between 1662 and 1668, a Baluchi adventurer impersonating the late Dara Shikoh successfully gathered around himself a large number of the Kolis of Viramgam and Chunwal. The Mughal commander Mohabat Khan had to march out to drive him away and take control of the Kolis. Records of the East India Company mention that the Ahmedabad route to Surat was particularly dangerous because of the constant irruption of brigands, robbers, piracy and highwaymen Kolis. In fact, in 1644, some Kolis attacked a caravan between Ahmedabad and Broach, Kolis armed with bows and arrows and muskets attacked Fidauddin Khan's forces in the mid-eighteenth century; the Kolis also launched guerrilla attacks on Gaikwad forces. But it is significant that the eighteenth-century Kolis of Gujarat refused to accept the Bhils as a Koli, Alexander K. Forbes, writing on the Kolis and the Bhils of Mahikantha in the period of the Gaikwads, mentions that tribal bhils were trying to be in Koli status. The above point indicates that the status of "Koli' had become a respectable one for those tribal groups in Gujarat who sought to distinguish themselves from the larger mass of their kinsmen. The Kolis seem to have attained an important socio political status by the fourteenth century, at least on Konkan coast in Maharashtra. A Koli kingdom is known to have been founded by Jayba Popera in North Konkan in 1342. The chief of the celebrated Janjira fort was a Koli named Ram Patil in the time of Shivaji, Kolis had served the Maratha army under their Koli commanders Yesaji Kank and Tanaji Malusare since the time of Shivaji and exercised considerable control over the Konkan coast. The Bahmanis conferred the rank of Sardar on Koli chiefs who held charge of hill tracts. In contrast, we have noted that the Kolis of Gujarat were mostly perceived as a predatory tribe. From the way they are described in the literature of the medieval period and in travellers accounts, we suspect that some descendants of medieval Bhil chiefs, particularly those of Ahmedabad, could have claimed the status of Koli.

The Bhil Kings have been mentioned in the Mahabharata as rulers of Malwa and Central India . From the time of the Mahabharata to 325 B.C 

Bhils were originally rulers of Idar, Rajpipla,  Mándvi Bánsda and Dharampur in southern Gujarat

Rebellion against Mughal 
Rana punja was grandson of Bhil Chief Harpal Bhil of Oghna Panarawa. He was the king of Merpur and he supported Maharana Pratap against Akbar.

Bhil Rebellion 

The Bhils of what is now the state of Gujarat rebelled on several occasions during the British colonial era, notably in 1846, 1857–58 and 1868.

Along with a number of other Indian social groups, the Bhils were designated as a criminal tribe by the British colonial government under the Criminal Tribes Act 1871, which meant that a Bhil could be "randomly picked up, tortured, maimed or even killed" by the colonial authorities. Susan Abraham notes that many of the tribes characterized as criminal under the Act had earlier rebelled against the East India Company and participated in the Indian Rebellion of 1857. She claims that the British colonial government legislated the Act in 1871 in the wake of these autochthonic tribes' proclivity for rebellion.

Mutiny against Mewar State
According to Ram Pande, in 1881, the Bhils protested against "the census classification, prohibition on alcohol manufacture, establishment of police and customs, and the ban on the killing of witches". Their campaigning was stepped up and given meaning by Govind Guru who was a social and political leader. Pande suggests that because of his long-term Brahminical Hinduism missionary work among the tribe, Govind was able to stop them consuming meat and alcohol, and to pressurize the state for the formation of village councils which could administer their own affairs and for barring forced labor. In 1917, Mewar State's Girasias joined the Bhils in the struggle to get the petty taxes and forced labour quashed, and to get the land revenues decreased. Taking note of these protests, the jagirdars of Mewar had called on a British political agent to suppress the mutiny. Pande noted that 1,500 Bhils got shot in 1908. In 1921, the tribals and peasants united under the leadership of Motilal Tejawat in the struggle against "forced labour, petty taxes, the disparity in taxes, high taxes and the tyrannical ways of the jagirdars". Tejawat's thoughts drew followers from the Bhils and Girasias of the Danta, Idar, Palanpur and Sirohi regions of Gujarat; and he "became a notorious offender against the state".

Demographics 
The Bhils are inhabitants of Dhar, Jhabua, Khargone and Ratlam districts of Madhya Pradesh. Bhilai (Bhil= Tribe, Aai= Came, meaning Bhils came), a city in Durg district of Chhattisgarh is named after this. A large number of Bhils live in the neighbouring states of Maharashtra, Gujarat and Rajasthan. They constitute the largest tribe of India.  According to Victoria R. Williams, the Bhils are India's "most widely dispersed tribal group". A small population of Bhils also resides in Pakistan's Sindh who are known as the Meghwar Bhil or just Meghwar.

Present circumstances 
The Bhil are classified as a Scheduled Tribe in Andhra Pradesh, Chhattisgarh, Gujarat, Karnataka, Madhya Pradesh, Maharashtra, Rajasthan and Tripura under the Indian government's reservation program of positive discrimination.

Sub-divisions 
The Bhil are divided into a number of endogamous territorial divisions, which in turn have a number of clans and lineages. In Rajasthan, they exist as Bhil Garasia, Dholi Bhil, Dungri Bhil, Dungri Garasia, Mewasi Bhil,Barda ,Warli, Bagdi, Dhodia, Nirdhi Bhil, Gamit, Rawal Bhil, Tadvi Bhil, Bhagalia,Bauris, Bhilala,Rathwa, Pawra, Barda,Warli , Nayak, Nahals ,Mathvadi, Dorepis,Dhanka, Vasava and Vasave.

Language 

The language commonly spoken by Bhils throughout their geographic distribution is Bhili. Bhili has about up to 36 identified dialects and pronunciation differs by region. Bhili is based on Gujarati, but dialects of Bhili gradually merge into more widely spoken languages such as Marathi in the southeast and Rajasthani in the northwest. Around 10 million people recorded themselves as speaking a Bhili dialect in the census.

Estimates of individuals speaking the language are often inaccurate as speakers of minor languages like Bhili have sometimes been treated as having major languages (such as Marathi or Gujarati) as their mother tongue.

The Bhil in Sindh speak Sindhi Bhil.

Culture 
Bhils have a rich and unique culture. The Bhilala sub-division is known for its Pithora painting. Ghoomar is a traditional folk dance of the Bhil tribe. Ghoomar is the symbol of womanhood. Young girls take part in this dance and declare that they are stepping into the shoes of women.

Art 

Bhil painting is characterised by the use of multi-coloured dots as in-filling. Bhuri Bai was the first Bhil artist to paint using readymade colours and paper. Other known Bhil artists include Lado Bai, Sher Singh, Ram Singh and Dubu Bariya.

Cuisine 
Main foods of Bhils are maize, onion, garlic and chili which they cultivate in their small fields. They collect fruits and vegetables from the local forests. Wheat and rice are used at time of festivals and other special occasions only. They keep self-made bows and arrows, swords, knives, axes etc. with them as weapons for self-defense and hunting the wild fauna which also form the major part of their diet. They profusely use alcohol distilled by them from the flower of Mahua (Madhuca longifolia). On festive occasions, various special preparation from the dish rich, i.e. maize, wheat, barley, malt and rice. Bhils are traditionally non-vegetarian.

Dress

The traditional dresses of men are the Pagri, Angarkha, Dhoti and Gamchha. Traditionally women wear Sari and Ghagra Choli.
 
There are many traditional ornaments of Bhils. Men wear Kada, Bajuband, Chain, ear rings, Kardhani. Women wear variety of ornaments such as hansli, ring, Zele-zumke, earring in Bhil language, narniyan (bangle), nathni (nose-jewel) etc. Tattooing is traditional custom among them. Women folks do tattooing generally before marriage.

Faith and worship
Every village has its own local deity (Gramdev) and families too have their Jatidev, Kuldev and Kuldevi (house hold deity) which is symbolised by stones. 'Bhati dev' and 'Bhilat dev' are their serpent-god. 'Baba dev' is their village god. Karkulia dev is their crop god, Gopal dev is their pastoral god, Bag dev is their Lion god, Bhairav dev is their dog god. Some of their other gods are Indel dev, Bada dev, Mahadevel, Tejaji, Lotha mai, Techma, Orka Chichma and Kajal dev.

They have extreme and staunch faith in superstitious beliefs and Bhopas for their physical, mental and psychological treatments.

 Bhensasaur - Bhil people worship buffalo as Bhensasaur 

According to Victoria R. Williams, the Bhils "identify largely as Hindu". The Dang Bhils follow Christianity, and the Nirdhi and Tadivi Bhils follow Islam. A number of other Bhils follow Sonatan (Sanskrit: Sanatan) which is their "own religion". Williams states that Sonatan "blends Hindu beliefs and animistic philosophies".

Bhil saints were mainly Vaishnava Hindus, and include Dhanraj Lodha, Govind Guru, Gulia Bhamda, Ramdas, Surmaldas, Tantya Mama, and Maharishi Valmiki.

Festivals
There are a number of festivals, viz. Rakhi, Navratri, Dashera, Diwali, Holi which are 
celebrated by the Bhils. They also celebrate some traditional festivals viz. Akhatij, Navmi, Howan Mata ki Chalavani, Sawan Mata ki jatar, Diwasa, Nawai, Bhagoria, Gal, Gar, Dhobi, Sanja, Indel, Doha etc. with ceremonious zeal and enthusiasm.

During some festivals there are a number of tribal fairs held at different places of districts. Navratri mela, Bhagoria mela (during Holi festival) etc. Bhil community of Udaipur celebrate Gavari festival  each year after Holi.

Communal dance and festivities

The chief means of their recreation is folk songs and dances. Women dance at birth celebrations, marriage functions and on a few festivals in traditional Bhili style accompanied by a drum beat. Their dances include the Lathi (staff) dance, Dhol dance, marriage dance, Holi dance, Battle dance, Bhagoria dance, Deepawal dance and hunting dance. Musical instruments include the Harmonium, Sarangi, Kundi, Bansuri, Apang, Khajria, Tabla, Jhanjh, Mandal and Thali. They are usually made from local products.

Local political structure 
Traditional each Bhil village is led by a headman (gameti). The gameti has authority and decision-making powers over most local disputes or issues.

Genetics
According to a genetic study on the Indian population in 2009, Bhill people of Gujarat carried around 27.27% of Y  haplogroup H, 18.18% Haplogroup J, 18.18% Haplogroup L, 18.18% Haplogroup R2, 9.09% Haplogroup R1a and 9.09% Haplogroup C.

Notable people
Bhuri Bai, Artist
Lado Bai, Artist
Tantia Bhīl, freedom fighter
Bhima Nayak, Freedom fighter

Chhotubhai Vasava, Politician
Rajkumar Roat, Politician
Shabri, As per legend a woman that interacted with Sri Rama

See also 
 Bhilala
 rathwa
 Mewar Bhil Corps
 India tribal belt

References 
Notes

Citations

Further reading

External links 

 History of Bhil Tribe in India - भील जनजाति का इतिहास
.
The desert dwellers of Rajasthan: Bishnoi and Bhil peoples (essay)
Bhil Tribe In Rajasthan 
 Genetic Affinity of the Bhil, Kol and Gond Mentioned in Epic Ramayana

 
Hindu ethnic groups
Social groups of Pakistan
Scheduled Tribes of Rajasthan
Scheduled Tribes of Maharashtra
Scheduled Tribes of Andhra Pradesh
Scheduled Tribes of Gujarat
Scheduled Tribes of Madhya Pradesh
Scheduled Tribes of Tripura
Scheduled Tribes of Karnataka
Scheduled Tribes of Chhattisgarh
Indo-Aryan peoples
Hindu communities
Ethnic groups in India
Ethnic groups in South Asia